La Bretenière is the name of the following communes in France:
La Bretenière, Doubs, in the Doubs department
La Bretenière, Jura, in the Jura department